Woodside High School is a public high school in Woodside, California, United States, on the border with Redwood City. It is part of the Sequoia Union High School District (SUHSD).

Woodside serves students from the surrounding communities of Portola Valley, Woodside and Redwood City. It shares a name to another school called Woodside High School in England.

Athletics
The school's football team won the California Interscholastic Federation's Central Coast Section title in 2004.

More recently, the school's girls' soccer team won the California Interscholastic Federation's Central Coast Section title in 2011 in a 0–0 tie with Santa Teresa High School.

Statistics

Demographics
2015–2016
 1,781 students: 862 male (48.4%), 919 female (51.6%)

Standardized testing

Notable alumni

Donald B. Ayer, (class of 1967), former United States Deputy Attorney General
Renel Brooks-Moon (class of 1976), San Francisco Giants baseball announcer and radio personality, 1972–76. 
Wendy Brown, Olympian
Julian Edelman (class of 2005), wide receiver for Super Bowl champion New England Patriots
Wendy Haas, vocalist and keyboardist best known for her work with the bands Santana and Azteca.
Rich Kelley, former professional basketball player, seventh selection of 1975 NBA draft
Lars Lyssand, soccer player
 Tyler MacNiven (class of 1998), winner of The Amazing Race 9 and filmmaker
Sean David Morton (class of 1976), incarcerated self-described psychic.
John Naber, former competition swimmer, five-time Olympic medalist
Folau Niua, professional rugby union player and Olympian with United States national rugby sevens team
Mike Nolan, football coach
Zack Test (class of 2007), professional rugby union player and Olympian with United States national rugby sevens team
Lillian "Pokey" Watson, Olympic gold medal swimmer, 1964, 1968, International Swimming Hall of Fame

See also

San Mateo County High Schools

References

External links
Official site
School newspaper

High schools in San Mateo County, California
Educational institutions established in 1958
Public high schools in California
Woodside, California
1958 establishments in California